Jonathan King (born 1967) is a New Zealand film director. He is the son of historian Michael King and brother of author Rachael King.

Biography 
King began his screening career as writer and director of the New Zealand black comedy movie Black Sheep and was in 2007 co-writer of the screenplay for The Tattooist. His most recent project is a feature-length remake of the New Zealand television series Under the Mountain, as writer (adapting from the original book by Maurice Gee), director and producer.

He has also written and illustrated a graphic novel, Inkberg Enigma, which was published in 2020 by Gecko Press. It was shortlisted for the 2021 Junior Fiction and the Best First Book awards at the New Zealand Book Awards for Children and Young Adults.

He is married to writer Rebecca Priestley.

Filmography

Publications 

 2020 – Inkberg Enigma,

References

External links
 

1967 births
Living people
New Zealand film directors